Muath Mahmoud Mosleh is a Jordanian footballer, of Palestinian origin, who plays as a forward for Al-Sareeh and Jordan U-23

International goals

With U-19

None-International goals

References
 (Amman) Signs Up Muath Mahmoud for 5 Years

External links 
 

Living people
Jordanian footballers
Jordan international footballers
Jordan youth international footballers
Association football forwards
1993 births
Jordanian people of Palestinian descent
Al-Jazeera (Jordan) players
Al-Sareeh SC players
Al-Baqa'a Club players
Al-Hussein SC (Irbid) players
Jordanian Pro League players